Sophie Doin (née, Mamy; 1800–1846), was a French novelist and essayist whose writings contributed to the renewal of abolitionism in France during the 1820s. She targeted abuses in the French colonies, most notably Guadeloupe and Martinique, where slavery continued for decades after the declaration of Haitian independence in 1804. In her various antislavery writings, notably the novel La Famille noire, ou la Traite de l’esclavage [The Black Family, or the Slave Trade], she drew the French public's attention to the injustices committed by the slave system. She called for a more humane treatment of Blacks, for the abolition of the slave trade, and for religious and practical education that would prepare slaves for eventual emancipation.

Biography
Doin was the only child of a wealthy Parisian family. In 1820 she married a doctor, Guillaume-Tell Doin, who was in poor health and financially irresponsible. Conflicts arose in the final years of their marriage, which Doin recounts in her autobiographical works. Until that time, however, Sophie and Guillaume Tell worked together to further a wide range of philanthropic and social causes including Greek independence. They were Protestants, as were other antislavery writers including Auguste de Staël and his mother Germaine de Staël.

During the 1820s, when an anti-slavery movement developed in France, Sophie and Guillaume Tell were associated with the Société de la morale chrétienne, which provided antislavery information, largely from sources in Britain, where abolitionism was far more developed than in France. Members of the Société were liberals who typically supported a constitutional monarchy.

Writings
La Famille noire, ou la Traite de l’esclavage is Doin's most significant abolitionist work. Written in a polemic style, La Famille noire draws on British sources to argue the case for ending the slave trade and ameliorating the fate of Blacks living under slavery. She draws attention to their strong family bonds and aptitude for education. She pleads for abolition of the slave trade although she does not espouse the cause of full emancipation, which would not be advocated in France until the 1840s. In her short stories "Blanche et noir" and "Noire et blanc" she promotes interracial marriage. She celebrates the independence gained by Haitians in 1804 and sees Haiti as a beacon of hope for blacks worldwide. In the short story "Le Négrier, " as in her other writings, Doin expresses her view that women's empathy and moral superiority give them a special role to play in antislavery.

Legacy
Sophie Doin remains a minor figure in the history of 19th century French literature. Her works are overshadowed by the more well-known French writings about slaves, notably Claire de Duras's Ourika and Victor Hugo's Bug Jargal. The literary merit of those works unquestionably justifies the greater literary consideration they have received. Doin's arguments against the abuses of slavery are far more direct and complex than theirs, however. Her writings thus deserve serious study as contributions to the historical record of French abolitionist thought.

Selected works
1825: La Famille noire, ou la Traite de l’esclavage
1826: Cornélie, nouvelle grecque, suivie de six nouvelles
1831: Cinq Chansons
1831: Poésies
1832-1833: Théâtre
1835: Quelques Pensées d’une femme sincèrement dévouée à la royauté de juillet
1836-1838: Le Christianisme, journal populaire
1842: Avis au public
1842: Simple Mémoire
1843: Un Cri de mère
1845: Ma Semaine

References

External links
Francophone Slavery

1800 births
1846 deaths
French women novelists
19th-century French novelists
French women essayists
19th-century French essayists
19th-century French women writers
Writers from Paris